Bhetapara is a fast-growing mixed residential and commercial area of Guwahati city in Kamrup Metropolitan district in Assam state in India. It connects the Indira Gandhi Athletic Stadium (main stadium of national games of country which held in the city in 2006) to the rest of the city.

Health
One Ayurvedic Health Centre under central government is located here..

Transport
It has a well-developed system of roads. It is connected with other parts of the city by buses (run both by private operators and ASTC), trekkers, e-rickshaws and other modes of transportation. It is connected to National Highway 37.

Sports
Maulana Md. Tayabullah Hockey Stadium is located here which hosted hockey matches at all levels and main stadium of hosting hockey matches during 33rd National Games 2007, Guwahati, and also during the 2016 South Asian Games which was held in Guwahati and Shillong.

Prominent Persons

Deepak Bhuyan:Theater and Film artiste resides in Bhetapara. He is the recipient of the prestigious state best actor award winner in 2007 for his work in Astaraag.

Notable personality and share market bull Mihir Vikash Mahanta resides in his ancestral home in Bhetapara. He is the only institutional investor from the state of Assam. Currently Mihir is the head of research in HDFC SECURITIES.

See also
 Beltola
 Chandmari
 Paltan Bazaar
 Ganeshguri
 Maligaon

References

External links
 

Neighbourhoods in Guwahati